Brian "Bomber" Brown is a Scottish-born Australian football player and coach. Brown's professional career started at Dumbarton FC, before he moved to Falkirk FC and later to Australia with Brunswick Juventus in the National Soccer League. Brown is the current head coach of NSW League One Bonnyrigg White Eagles.

Football career
Brown started his career with Dumbarton FC making his professional debut as a 17-year-old. In 1977, Brown was transferred to his boyhood club, Falkirk FC, where he would quickly become a fan favorite. Brown was made club captain and went on to feature in 269 games, scoring 30 goals and being inducting into the Falkirk FC Hall of Fame in 2001.

In 1984, Brown moved to Australia to play for Brunswick Juventus in the National Soccer League. In his second year with Brunswick, Brown was made captain and quickly established himself as one of Australia's best defenders.

During Brown's time, Brunswick Juventus claimed silverware three times and in 1985 were crowned champions of Australia, defeating Heidelberg United, South Melbourne and Preston Makedonia in the Southern Conference play-offs before defeating Sydney City over two legs in the Grand Final.

Brown played for three more seasons until officially retiring in 1988. He would later take up an assistant coach role with Brunswick Juventus in 1991 before moving to New Zealand with his family.

In 1999, Brown would take up the head coach position with NSW State League giants Blacktown City FC. During Brown's time at Blacktown City FC, they would feature in 6 consecutive Grand Finals (winning 2) and claiming 4 Minor Premierships.

Following the end of the 2005 season, Brown moved to take up the head coach position with Australian giants Marconi Stallions. After 2 seasons with Marconi, Brown moved to Sutherland Sharks FC and would claim the Championship defeating his former club Marconi Stallions in 2008.

He would later be offered an assistant role at A-League club North Queensland Fury but turned it down.

In 2009, Brown made the switch to Bonnyrigg White Eagles FC and claimed Premierships in the 2010 and 2012, as well as Championships in 2013 and 2015, defeating Rockdale City Suns FC and Blacktown City FC respectively.

Since 1999, Brown has accumulated over 400 games as a coach in the NSW Premier League. His teams have featured in 10 Grand Finals and been Minor Premiers 8 times. He is regarded as one of the best coaches ever involved in the competition and has been voted the leagues "Coach of the Year" a record 6 times.

Honours

Club
 Blacktown City FC
 NSW Super League Champions: 1999, 2000
 NSW Super League Premiers: 2000
 NSW Premier League Premiers: 2000/1, 2002/3, 2004/5
 Sutherland Sharks FC
 NSW Premier League Champions: 2008
 Bonnyrigg White Eagles
 NSW Premier League Premiers: 2010, 2012, 2014
 NSW Premier League Champions: 2013, 2015
 Brunswick Juventus
 Victorian Premier League Champions: 1991
 Victorian Premier League Runners Up: 1990
 National Soccer League Champions: 1985'''

Personal Honours
Falkirk FC Hall of Fame (inducted 2001)

Falkirk FC Player of the Year: 1978/79

NSW Premier League Coach of the Season – 2000, 2001, 2003, 2008, 2010, 2012

Representative Honours
NSW XI Representative Coaching – 2000, 2001 & 2003

References

External links
Brian Brown at Aussie Footballers
http://www.nswpl.com.au/index.php?id=243&tx_ttnews%5Byear%5D=2009&tx_ttnews%5Bmonth%5D=04&tx_ttnews%5Btt_news%5D=1941&cHash=29fbc4d94ffc71924c2b6614f08e45d8
http://www.nswpl.com.au/index.php?id=243&tx_ttnews%5Byear%5D=2013&tx_ttnews%5Bmonth%5D=09&tx_ttnews%5Btt_news%5D=8225&cHash=b35c1148857150926188c2cd108dfcc4
http://au.fourfourtwo.com/news/85714,bomber-brown-snubs-nqfc-role.aspx
http://www.fairfieldchampion.com.au/story/1467665/eagles-coachs-handshake-seals-real-deal/
http://www.ozfootball.net/ark/NSL/1985/Playoff.html

1957 births
Living people
Scottish footballers
Dumbarton F.C. players
Falkirk F.C. players
Scottish Football League players
Footballers from Falkirk
Scottish expatriate footballers
Expatriate soccer players in Australia
National Soccer League (Australia) players
Association football defenders